Sara Svendsen (born 1980) is a retired Norwegian cross-country skier.

She made her World Cup debut in the 2003–04 season opener at Beitostølen, finishing 66th. She collected her first World Cup points with a 28th place in the February 2008 Falun 15 km pursuit, and also competed in World Cup relays. She improved to a 15th place at the Holmenkollen ski festival in March 2008. Her last World Cup outing was the 2010–11 Tour de Ski.

She represented the sports clubs Tromsø SK.

References 

1980 births
Living people
Sportspeople from Tromsø
Norwegian female cross-country skiers